Barclosh Castle is a ruined 16th-century tower house situated near Dalbeattie, Dumfries and Galloway.  There remains a section of wall 4 feet thick and 27 feet high.

References
 Coventry, Martin (2001) The Castles of Scotland, 3rd Ed. Scotland: Goblinshead  
Maxwell-Irving, A. M. T. (2000) The Border Towers of Scotland, Creedon Publications

External links
 Photo of the castle at scran.ac.uk

Castles in Dumfries and Galloway
Tower houses in Scotland